Stan Torgerson, (May 25, 1924 – June 26, 2006), was the announcer of the Ole Miss Rebels for a total of 17 years.

References

1924 births
2006 deaths
American radio personalities